Vladimir Paznikov (born 1949 in Novosibirsk, Soviet Union - died June 2008 Novosibirsk) was a Soviet international speedway rider who reached the final of the Speedway World Championship in 1973. He was also a very accomplished ice speedway rider and member of the Soviet team that finished third in the World Team Cup final in 1973.

World Final appearances

Individual World Championship
 1973 -  Chorzów, Silesian Stadium - 6th - 8pts

World Team Cup
 1973 -  London, Wembley Stadium (with Valery Gordeev / Grigory Khlinovsky / Aleksandr Pavlov / Viktor Trofimov) - 3rd - 20pts (5)
 1976 -  London, White City Stadium (with Viktor Trofimov / Valery Gordeev / Grigory Khlinovsky / Vladimir Gordeev) - 4th - 11pts (2)

Individual Ice Speedway World Championship
 1972 -  Nässjö - 3rd - 12+3pts
 1973 -  Inzell - 3rd - 24pts

References

Soviet speedway riders
Sportspeople from Novosibirsk
1949 births

2008 deaths